Muthoot Microfin Limited, the microfinance arm of Muthoot Pappachan Group, is an Indian microfinance institution focused on providing microloans to women entrepreneurs with a focus on rural regions of India.

History 
Muthoot Pappachan Group acquired the non-bank financial institution Panchratna Securities Limited and the name was changed to Muthoot Microfin Limited pursuant to a resolution passed by the shareholders of company at the EGM held on October 29, 2012. A fresh certificate of incorporation, consequent upon change of name was granted to the company by the RoC on November 06, 2012. Subsequently, Mithoot Microfin Limited was granted non-bank financial institution microfinance institution status by the Reserve Bank of India on March 25, 2015.

Mahila mitra app 

In 2021, Muthoot Microfin Ltd launched Mahila Mitra app to help rural women beneficiaries with ease of repayment.

References 

Microfinance companies of India